Ludovic Depickère (born 29 July 1969 in Wattrelos, Nord) is a retired butterfly and freestyle swimmer from France, who represented his native country at three consecutive Summer Olympics, starting in 1988. He was affiliated with a club called Dauphins Wattrelos.

References
 
 

1969 births
Living people
French male freestyle swimmers
Swimmers at the 1988 Summer Olympics
Swimmers at the 1992 Summer Olympics
Swimmers at the 1996 Summer Olympics
Olympic swimmers of France
People from Wattrelos
Sportspeople from Nord (French department)
French male butterfly swimmers